Sekhana Koko (born 23 July 1983) is a Motswana footballer playing for Mochudi Centre Chiefs in the Botswana First Division South and the Botswana national football team.

Honours

Club

 Jwaneng Galaxy
Mascom Top 8 Cup:1
2016-17

 Township Rollers
Botswana Premier League:3
2010-11, 2013-14, 2015-16
Mascom Top 8 Cup:1
2011-12

References

1983 births
Botswana footballers
Living people
Association football wingers
Botswana international footballers